Saint Senara is a legendary Cornish saint with links to the village of Zennor on the north coast of Cornwall
, UK. The Church of Saint Senara, Zennor is dedicated to her; the village, nearby headland Zennor Head, and the neolithic tomb Zennor Quoit received her name indirectly.

Historical records
According to scholar Nicholas Orme, a Saint Sinar of Zennor was first recorded in 1170 as a male saint ("Sanctus Sinar"), but from 1235 onwards as a female one ("Sancta Sinara"). Orme states that unless she can be identified with Azenor, the mother of Saint Budoc in Breton legends, nothing else is recorded about her. He also points out the similarity to Saint Senan, commemorated at nearby Sennen.

Legend
Senara was reputedly a Breton princess of Brest originally named Asenora, She was married to a Breton king who wrongly accused her of adultery and threw her into the sea in a barrel while pregnant. She was visited by an angel, whilst floating in the sea off the westernmost end of Cornwall, and gave birth to a son in the waves, who later became Saint Budoc or an Irish bishop. She was washed up on the Cornish coast, and some believe she founded Zennor and gave her name to the eponymous village (and subsequently Zennor Head, Zennor Quoit and Porthzennor Cove), before continuing to Ireland.

Due to the striking similarity, the legend's origins possibly lie in Greek mythology and the story of Danaë who was also cast to sea with her son Perseus in a wooden box.

Legacy

Senara was highly venerated by local fishermen and is said to represent the dual nature of Christ (human and divine). She gives her name to St Senara's Church in Zennor and it contains the Mermaid Chair, an ancient chair with carvings of fish on the seat and a pew end with a depiction of the mermaid admiring herself in a mirror, which is believed to be at least 600 years old. A statue of St Senara lies in an enclosed garden next to the church.

Modern adaptations
Senara is the subject of a book and linked to the Mermaid of Zennor by Sue Monk Kidd, The Mermaid Chair, which was adapted into a movie in 2006.

References

Medieval Breton saints
Castaways
Cornish folklore
Christian female saints of the Middle Ages
Folk saints
Medieval Cornish saints
Medieval legends
Angelic visionaries